Ben Thomas McGuire (born 31 December 1991) is an English cricketer.  McGuire is a left-handed batsman who bowls right-arm medium pace.  He was born in Ashington, Northumberland.

Having played for the Nottinghamshire Second XI since 2008, McGuire made his only appearance for Nottinghamshire in a List A match against Gloucestershire in the 2009 NatWest Pro40.  In this match, he was dismissed for David Payne.  It was in 2009 that McGuire made his debut for Staffordshire in Minor counties cricket, against Suffolk in the MCCA Knockout Trophy.  McGuire still plays for Staffordshire, making to date 8 Minor Counties Championship and 12 MCCA Knockout Trophy matches.  Having stopped playing for the Nottinghamshire Second XI in 2009, McGuire has represented the Worcestershire Second XI in 2011.

References

External links
Ben McGuire at ESPNcricinfo
Ben McGuire at CricketArchive

1991 births
Living people
Sportspeople from Ashington
Cricketers from Northumberland
English cricketers
Staffordshire cricketers
Nottinghamshire cricketers